Paratilapia toddi is a small species of fish in the family Cichlidae. It is only known from the type locality of Lusambo, Kasai River.

References

Paratilapia
Fish described in 1905